The UNAF Women's Club Tournament is an international club women's association football club competition run by the Union of North African Football Federations (UNAF). The top club sides from North Africa's football women's leagues are invited to participate in this competition.

History
The competition started in 2007 after decision of the UNAF committee. The three first editions were held successfully.
The 2010 UNAF Women's Club Tournament, initially held from 12 to 18 July 2010 in Morocco was postponed because of the withdrawal on first of Wadi Degla from Egypt which were replaced by the Moroccan team Raja CA. however ASE Alger Centre from Algeria declared to withdraw, so the organisation committee declared the tournament cancelled.
The 2011 UNAF Women's Club Tournament, initially held in May 2011 was cancelled also but because Tunisian Revolution, however, UNAF negotiated with a Tunisian champion AS Banque de l'Habitat to organize the competition in Aïn Draham from 23 June to 3 July but it was finally cancelled too.

Finals

 A round-robin tournament determined the final standings.

Records and statistics

Performance by club

Performance by nation

Maghreb Women's Club Tournament
The tournament was a related annual competition held in Aïn Defla, Algeria from 2010 to 2012. Women's clubs from Algeria, Morocco and Tunisia took part in these three editions. Afak Relizane won the tournament twice in 2010 and 2012 while ASE Alger Centre won once in 2011.

References

External links 
 2008 UNAF Women's Club Tournament in Algiers - djazairess.com

UNAF Women's Club Tournament
Women's UNAF Club Tournament